Nickel(II) perchlorate is a inorganic compound with the chemical formula of Ni(ClO4)2, and it is a strong oxidizing agent. Its colours are different depending on water. For example, the hydrate forms cyan crystals, the pentahydrate forms green crystals, but the hexahydrate (Ni(ClO4)2·6H2O) forms blue crystals.

Preparation 
The hexahydrate of nickel(II) perchlorate can be obtained by reacting perchloric acid with nickel(II) hydroxide, nickel(II) chloride or nickel(II) carbonate: The resulting salt is a pentahydrate, Ni(ClO4)2·5H2O. At −21.3 °C (251.9 K; -6.3 °F), the nonahydrate Ni(ClO4)2·9H2O  will be formed.

Ni(OH)2 + 2HClO4 + 4H2O → Ni(ClO4)2•6H2O

Nickel(II) perchlorate can also be obtained by adding nickel to 6 mol/L perchloric acid for electrolysis with an alternating current of 50 Hz.

The yellow anhydrous product is obtained by adding nickel(II) trifluoroacetate and perchloric acid in a trifluoroacetic acid solvent.

Properties 

Nickel(II) perchlorate hexahydrate is a green odourless crystalline solid that is highly soluble in water and soluble in many organic solvents. It begins to decompose from a temperature of 103 °C. It has the hexagonal crystal structure with space group P6/mmm (No. 191). In addition to the hexahydrate, there is also a nonahydrate, a tetrahydrate, a hydrate and a pentahydrate.

Applications 
Nickel(II) perchlorate hexahydrate is used in the manufacture of other chemical compounds. For example, it is used as a starting material for homometallic trinuclear scorpionate complexes in studies of electronic and magnetic properties. It also serves as a detonator in explosives.

Other compounds 
 Ni(ClO4)2 also forms some compounds with NH3, such as Ni(ClO4)2·6NH3 which is a light purple crystal.
 Ni(ClO4)2 also forms some compounds with N2H4, including Ni(ClO4)2·2N2H4 as a light positive solid or Ni(ClO4)2·5N2H4 which are purple crystals.
 Ni(ClO4)2 forms compounds with CO(NH2)2, like Ni(ClO4)2·6CO(NH2)2 which is a yellow-green solid.
 Ni(ClO4)2 forms compounds with CON3H5, for example Ni(ClO4)2·3CON3H5 which is a blue solid.
 Ni(ClO4)2 forms compounds with CON4H6, such as Ni(ClO4)2·3CON4H6 which is an explosive blue crystal with a bulk density of 0.95 g/cm³.
 Ni(ClO4)2 can also form compounds with CS(NH2)2, such as Ni(ClO4)2·6CS(NH2)2 which is a pale green solid.
 Ni(ClO4)2 also forms some compounds with CSN3H5, such as Ni(ClO4)2·2CSN3H5·3H2O which is a blue paramagnetic crystal or Ni(ClO4)2·3CSN3H5·2H2O which is a dark positive crystal.
 Ni(ClO4)2 also forms some compounds with pyridine.

See also
 Nickel
 Perchloric acid

References 

Oxidizing agents
Nickel compounds
Perchlorates